The Recoil is a 1924 American silent drama film directed by T. Hayes Hunter based on a Rex Beach story. Mahlon Hamilton and Betty Blythe star. Blythe filmed some scenes for the picture in Paris in November 1923.

Plot
As described in a film magazine review, Gordon Kent, an enormously wealthy American, comes from South America to paint Europe red with wild parties with beautiful women and where champagne flows from fountains. In Deauville he meets and loves Norma Selbee, a penniless American who rings herself in during one of Kent's lavish parties. They marry, but despite receiving showered attentions from her husband, Norma elopes with the wily adventurer Marchmont. William Sothern, Kent's famous detective friend, discloses that Marchmont is a crook, and that Norma's crook husband Jim Selbee is still alive. Kent revenges himself by forcing Marchmont and Noima to always live together under penalty of his turning both over to the police. The two wander over Europe and hate one another. In New York, Jim Selbee tries to blackmail Kent. Norma warns him. Selbee is killed by Marchmont, and Kent, regretting his actions, takes Norma with him to happiness in South America.

Cast
Mahlon Hamilton as Gordon Kent
Betty Blythe as Norma Selbee
Clive Brook as Marchmont
Fred Paul as William Southern
Ernest Hilliard as Jim Selbee

Preservation
The film has been preserved by MGM.

See also
White Shoulders (1931)

References

External links

Lantern slide
Still at silenthollywood.com

1924 films
American silent feature films
Goldwyn Pictures films
Films directed by T. Hayes Hunter
1924 drama films
Silent American drama films
American black-and-white films
Films with screenplays by Gerald Duffy
Films based on works by Rex Beach
1920s American films